Dirty Loops is a band from Stockholm, Sweden, made up of Jonah Nilsson (vocals and piano), Henrik Linder (bass) and Aron Mellergård (drums). Their arrangements borrow from jazz and jazz fusion, gospel, funk, electronica, pop, and disco. They are known for their jazz fusion reharmonized covers of pop songs like "Baby" by Justin Bieber, "Rolling in the Deep" by Adele, and "Wake Me Up" by Avicii. They also performed the 2016 rendition of the song "Over the Horizon" for Samsung Electronics.

Background
All three of the band's members studied music at Södra Latin together. Nilsson studied classical theory while Linder and Mellergårdh studied jazz.

After upper secondary school, they attended the Royal College of Music in Stockholm together. Jonah Nilsson has also studied music at Betel College in Stockholm. Henrik Linder attended Adolf Fredrik Music School as a child.

Henrik Linder began his music career as a pianist at the age of four and bass at the age of 13.

Jonah Nilsson also started singing as a child, and his parents sang in the choir of Katarina Church, Stockholm. At the age of 11 he began playing piano. He appeared as a backing singer and played piano on Danny Saucedo's tour in 2005, the same year that Danny made his debut on the TV show Swedish Idol.

History
The band was formed in 2008 and released their first song in 2010. In February 2011, they signed a management contract with producer and songwriter Andreas Carlsson. On September 3, 2011, the band backed Danny Saucedo at the Aftonbladet music gala, "Rockbjörnen".

Manager Andreas Carlsson has prioritised developing the band's brand. Above all, he has advised them to be careful about what they upload and publish on the Internet. They have appeared in several television interviews, and in 2015 they appeared as middle act in the Swedish Melodifestivalen where they performed the 2014 winning song "Undo" performed by artist Sanna Nielsen.

Andreas Carlsson has helped the band to get a global record deal. In 2012, the band traveled to the U.S. to face several major music profiles, among others, singer Brian McKnight, drummer Simon Phillips and bassist Nathan East. Eventually, they signed a record contract with world-renowned producer and record label director David Foster and Universal Music subsidiary Verve.

Debut album: Loopified
Their debut album, Loopified was released on 16 April 2014, in Japan, on May 19 in the UK, and on 19 August in the US.

Hiatus and Phoenix 
Citing creative differences during the early production of their second album, the group have announced that they would go on hiatus and pursue individual interests. On 26 December 2018,  they formed a Dream Theater tribute band but didn't tell anyone, never practiced or ever played a Dream Theater song ever because they were far too complicated but they posted on their Instagram hinting towards the completion of their second album, marking the end of their hiatus. The first single off of their second album was released on 20 May 2019.

Turbo (2021-present)
On 19 August 2021 Cory Wong and Dirty Loops released a single entitled "Follow the Light."  On 26 August they released their second single "Ring of Saturn."  It is off the collaborative album Turbo which was released on 3 September.

Tours

David Foster and Andreas Carlsson 
In late 2012 the band supported David Foster and Andreas Carlsson in Japan, China, Indonesia, Singapore, and Thailand for the "David Foster & Friends Tour." They played for tens of thousands of people during the tour. One highlight of the tour was when Jonah and Chaka Khan performed together as a duet.

Maroon V Tour 
The band opened for Maroon 5 during the Asia and Oceania legs of the Maroon V Tour, a worldwide concert tour by American band Maroon 5 in support of their fifth album V. The tour was announced on 2 September 2014, and began on 16 February 2015. The tour took place in North America, Europe, Africa, Asia and Oceania until October 2015.

Note

Members

Jonah Nilsson – vocals, keyboards 
Jonah's musical journey began when he sang in the choir at the Katarina Church in Stockholm, conducted by his parents at age one. He also started learning the double bass at age eight, but quickly made a switch to piano lessons in classical music at age 11, inspired by one of his favorite Chopin pieces, Fantasie Impromptu in C sharp minor. In his final year at high school, he switched over to jazz piano studies. He attended various music schools including Sodra Latin, Adolf Fredrik School of Music, Betel College and the Royal Music Academy in Stockholm.

At age 17, he collaborated with Arvid Svenungsson to produce a biblical-based musical centered on the character Job. He met Aron Mellergård and wrote songs together in the vein of groovy funk, inspired by music of the 80's and bands like Toto. Later, he joined Danny Saucedo's tour as backing vocals and keyboardist. His songwriting and music production skills caused him to be well sought after by many, including Jenny Berggren, a former member of the band Ace of Base.

Henrik Linder – bass guitar 
Henrik Linder was born in Sweden and started playing piano at age 4. Growing up, he listened to music that his older sister listened to, including artists such as Soundgarden since he liked the band's use of odd meters in their songs. When he was around 12 years old, a girl he had a crush on told him that bass was the "sexiest instrument".

Later on, at 13 years old, Linder switched to bass guitar. One of his first childhood bass idols was Flea from the Red Hot Chili Peppers after listening to the band's song "Aeroplane" from the album One Hot Minute. In addition, Linder later discovered groups like The Brecker Brothers and Tribal Tech, featuring Gary Willis on bass. Gary Willis would become one of his greatest influences. Linder also started taking lessons with a local Swedish bass player, Robert Sudin. At age 16, Linder was already a busy Stockholm session musician and played with many different groups.

Linder attended secondary school at Södra Latin, and afterwards, studied jazz at the Royal College of Music in Stockholm, Sweden. While studying, he collaborated with his childhood friend and drummer Aron Mellergårdh. As classmates at the Royal Academy of Music, they would both practice and jam together as much as possible. Later on, Mellergårdh and Linder started working with another one of their classmates and childhood friends, pianist and vocalist Jonah Nilsson. Their collaboration eventually led to the creation of Dirty Loops in 2008.

Aron Mellergård – drums
Aron Mellergård grew up in Gislaved Sweden where he was inspired to learn to play the drums from a musical family. He met future Dirty Loops bandmates Jonah Nilsson and Henrik Linder at Södra Latin, a secondary school in Södermalm Stockholm. He then attended the Royal College of Music in Stockholm before committing to Dirty Loops.

Discography

Studio albums

Singles

References

External links
 Official Website
 

Musical groups established in 2008
Musical groups from Stockholm
Jazz fusion ensembles